That's Life is a 2007 album by British tenor Russell Watson.

Track listing
"That's Life" (Kelly Gordon, Dean Kay) - 3:12
"Strangers in the Night"  (Bert Kaempfert, Charlie Singleton, Eddie Snyder) - 4:47
"When I Fall in Love" (Edward Heyman, Victor Young) - 3:45
"You Don't Know Me" (Eddy Arnold, Cindy Walker) - 3:18
"You Make Me Feel So Young" (Mack Gordon, Joseph Myrow)- 3:01
"Born Free" (John Barry, Don Black) - 2:56
"Summer Wind" (Hans Bradtke, Henry Mayer, Johnny Mercer) - 3:35
"I Left My Heart in San Francisco"  (George Cory, Douglas Cross)- 3:43
"Let There Be Love" (Ian Grant, Lionel Rand) - 3:18
"Smile" (Charlie Chaplin, John Turner, Geoffrey Parsons) - 4:08
"It Was a Very Good Year" (Ervin Drake) - 5:48
"To All the Girls I've Loved Before" (with Alexander O'Neal) (Hal David, Albert Hammond) - 3:52

This album was produced by British record producer, Simon Franglen.

Charts

Weekly charts

Year-end charts

References

Russell Watson albums
2007 albums
Classical crossover albums